The Śāriputrābhidharma-śāstra (Ch. Shèlìfú Āpítán Lùn, 舍利弗阿毘曇論, Taisho: 28, No. 1548, pp. 525c-719a) is a Buddhist Abhidharma text of the Sthāvirāḥ Dharmaguptaka school, the only surviving Abhidharma from that school. It was translated into Chinese in thirty fascicles between 407 and 414 CE by the monks Dharmayasas and Dharmagupta at Ch'ang An.

According to Erich Frauwallner, it contains some of the same doctrinal content and listings that appear in the Vibhaṅga and Dharmaskandha, which is based on an "ancient core" of early Abhidharma.

Content 
The Śāriputrābhidharma is divided into five parts:

 Sapraśnaka
 The 12 āyatanāni
 The 18 dhatāvah
 The 5 skandhāh
 The 4 āryasatyāni
 The 22 indriyāni
 the 7 bodhyaṅgāni
 the 3 akuśala-mūlani
 the 3 kuśala-mūlani
 the 4 mahābhūtāni
 the upāsakaha (its 5 samvarāh)
 Apraśnaka
 dhātuḥ
 karma
 pudgalaḥ (person)
 jñānam
 the pratītyasamutpādaḥ
 the 4 smṛtyupasthānāni
 the 4 samyakprahānāni (right abandonment)
 the 4 ṛddhipāda
 the 4 dhyānāni
 mārgaḥ
 akusalā dharmāḥ
 Saṃgraha
 Enumeration and explanation of the elements to be discussed (mainly, the list of the Sapraśnaka)
 In which skandhāh,  dhatāvah, and āyatanāni these elements are contained.
 Saṃprayoga
 Enumeration and explanation of the mental elements to be discussed. Frauwallner states: "the old mātrkā [list] has been wholly abandoned and replaced by a long list of mental elements, and the question dealt with here is with which elements the elements of this list can be connected."
 In which skandhāh,  dhatāvah, and āyatanāni these elements are contained.
 Prasthāna
 the 10 pratyayāḥ (conditions)
 the hetavaḥ (causes)
 nāmarūpam (name and form)
 the 10 saṃyojanāni
 the kāya-, vāk-, and manaścaritam (bodily, vocal and mental acts)
 sparśaḥ (sense contact)
 cittam (mind)
 the 10 akusalāḥ  karmapathāḥ (unwholesome karma paths)
 the 10 kusalāḥ  karmapathāḥ
 samādhiḥ

References 

Abhidharma